Kashi Vishwanath may refer to:

Kashi Vishwanath Temple a Hindu temple in Uttar Pradesh dedicated to Lord Shiva
Kashi Vishwanath Express an Indian express train that runs between Banaras in Uttar Pradesh and New Delhi railway station
Kashi Vishwanath (film) a 2019 Bhojpuri language Indian film